The cabinet of Gheorghe Manu was the government of Romania from 5 November 1889 to 15 February 1891.

Ministers
The ministers of the cabinet were as follows:

President of the Council of Ministers:
Gheorghe Manu (5 November 1889 - 15 February 1891)
Minister of the Interior: 
Gheorghe Manu (5 November 1889 - 15 February 1891)
Minister of Foreign Affairs: 
Alexandru N. Lahovari (5 November 1889 - 15 February 1891)
Minister of Finance:
Menelas Ghermani (5 November 1889 - 15 February 1891)
Minister of Justice:
Theodor Rosetti (5 November 1889 - 16 November 1890)
Grigore Triandafil (16 November 1890 - 15 February 1891)
Minister of War:
Gen. Matei Vlădescu (5 November 1889 - 15 February 1891)
Minister of Religious Affairs and Public Instruction:
(interim) Theodor Rosetti (5 - 16 November 1889)
Titu Maiorescu (16 November 1889 - 15 February 1891)
Minister of Agriculture, Industry, Commerce, and Property:
Grigore Păucescu (5 November 1889 - 16 November 1890)
Alexandru Marghiloman (16 November 1890 - 15 February 1891)
Minister of Public Works:
Alexandru Marghiloman (5 - 16 November 1889)
(interim) Titu Maiorescu (16 November 1889 - 15 February 1891)

References

Cabinets of Romania
Cabinets established in 1889
Cabinets disestablished in 1891
1889 establishments in Romania
1891 disestablishments in Romania